Georgi Seganov (born 10 June 1993) is a Bulgarian professional volleyball player. He is a member of the Bulgaria national team. Seganov competed for his national team at the 2014 World Championship held in Poland. At the professional club level, he plays for GKS Katowice.

References

External links

 
 Player profile at LegaVolley.it  
 Player profile at Volleybox.net

1993 births
Living people
People from Razlog
Sportspeople from Blagoevgrad Province
Bulgarian men's volleyball players
Bulgarian expatriate sportspeople in Italy
Expatriate volleyball players in Italy
Bulgarian expatriate sportspeople in Turkey
Expatriate volleyball players in Turkey
Bulgarian expatriate sportspeople in Poland
Expatriate volleyball players in Poland
GKS Katowice (volleyball) players
Setters (volleyball)